Red is the fourth studio album by American singer-songwriter Taylor Swift. It was released on October 22, 2012, by Big Machine Records. The album's title refers to the tumultuous, "red" emotions Swift experienced during the album's conception; its songs discuss the complex and conflicting feelings resulting from fading romance.

Hoping to experiment with new sounds beyond her previous albums' country pop style, Swift engaged new producers Dann Huff, Max Martin, Shellback, Jeff Bhasker, Dan Wilson, Jacknife Lee, Butch Walker, alongside her long-time collaborator Nathan Chapman. The record combines styles of pop, country, and rock, with eclectic elements including arena rock, Britrock, dance-pop, hip hop, and dubstep. Big Machine promoted Red as a country album but many critics disputed this categorization and deemed it a pop record. The album was supported with seven singles, including the US Billboard Hot 100 number-one lead single "We Are Never Ever Getting Back Together" and the Mainstream Top 40 number-one single "I Knew You Were Trouble".

In the US, Red spent seven weeks atop the Billboard 200—making Swift the first female artist and the second act since the Beatles to have three consecutive albums each spend at least six weeks at number one, and was certified seven-times Platinum by the Recording Industry Association of America (RIAA). It topped the charts and received multi-platinum certifications in Australia, Canada, New Zealand, and the United Kingdom. The album received nominations for Album of the Year at the 2013 Country Music Association Awards, and Album of the Year and Best Country Album at the 2014 Grammy Awards. Swift promoted the album with the Red Tour (2013–2014), which grossed $150 million.

Critics praised Swift's songwriting in Red but they were divided on the album's sonic range; praise was directed at the album's versatility but criticism targeted its inconsistency. Retrospectively, many critics have regarded Red as Swift's best album and a transitional record bridging her country roots to mainstream pop. It appeared in publications' lists of the best albums of the 2010s decade, and ranked at number 99 in the 2020 revision of Rolling Stone 500 Greatest Albums of All Time. Following the 2019 dispute regarding the ownership of Swift's back catalog, she released a re-recording, Red (Taylor's Version), in November 2021.

Background 
Singer-songwriter Taylor Swift released her third studio album, Speak Now, in October 2010. Rolling Stone reported in 2020 that Swift wrote the music to Speak Now alone to prove to critics she was capable; Swift herself says it happened by accident as she would write songs in early morning hours and did not have a co-writer around before she finished the songs. Speak Now, which was co-produced by Swift and her longtime collaborator Nathan Chapman, expands on her characteristic country pop sound with increasingly frequent elements of radio-friendly pop crossover, which are evident on its predecessor, Fearless (2008). It incorporates various rock styles, including pop rock, arena rock, and new wave rock. Speak Now was the fastest-selling digital album by a female artist, with 278,000 downloads in a week, earning Swift an entry in the 2010 Guinness World Records. At the 54th Grammy Awards in 2012, the album was nominated for Best Country Album, and its single "Mean" won Best Country Song and Best Country Solo Performance.

Recording and production 

After the release of Speak Now, Swift planned to continue collaborating with Chapman for its follow-up. By October 2011, she had written around 25 songs. Executives at Swift's label Big Machine congratulated her on having finalized the album within one year. Swift said she had been repeating the same songwriting process she used for Speak Now, which diminished her creativity. She sought to collaborate with Chapman and new producers to venture outside of her comfort zone of writing songs alone. While Speak Now was Swift's statement as a songwriter, she envisioned her fourth studio album as a statement of her "thirst for learning". She reworked the new album while touring Speak Now.

Swift, aiming to experiment with as many styles as she could, decided her fourth studio album would not follow one coherent genre. To this end, she recruited musicians whose works she admired, hoping to learn from them. Although Swift wanted to experiment with various musical styles, she prioritized the lyrics over the production and strove to capture her emotions, as she had done on her previous songs. Songwriting would start by identifying an emotion with a song, and production would follow. On songs Swift co-wrote, she first presented her co-writers with the feelings she had been going through, played a rough demo on her guitar, and asked for their ideas on ways to better convey the story. Each song's production corresponded to the emotion it portrayed, resulting in an eclectic mix of styles.

The first song written for the album was "All Too Well", which Swift began writing in February 2011 during a rehearsal of the Speak Now tour. Having recently ended a relationship, Swift began ad-libbing self-written lyrics about heartbreak on a four-chord guitar riff as her touring band spontaneously played backing instruments. A critical point during a recording session with Chapman was the song "Red", on which her creativity "started wandering to all the places [she] could go". Big Machine's president Scott Borchetta overheard Chapman's original production and suggested a more pop-oriented sound. After several failed attempts to get the desired sound, Swift asked Borchetta to recruit Swedish producer Max Martin, whose ability to "just land a chorus" for his chart-topping pop songs intrigued Swift. Martin and his frequent collaborator Shellback produced the songs "22", "I Knew You Were Trouble", and "We Are Never Ever Getting Back Together", all of which are characterized by Martin's  and Shellback's  trademark synthesizers and electronic production. The final version of "Red" was produced by Swift, Chapman, and Dann Huff. Huff, who had produced for several country artists, worked with Swift and Chapman on "Starlight" and "Begin Again".

Another new collaborator was Jeff Bhasker, whose production of "We Are Young" (2011) by indie band Fun captivated Swift by its drum instrumentation. Bhasker produced two songs: "Holy Ground" and "The Lucky One". Swift worked with Butch Walker on the song "Everything Has Changed", a duet with English singer Ed Sheeran. She admired Walker for the way "he creates this really organic but emotionally charged music". "Treacherous" was produced by Dan Wilson, whose work with his band Semisonic inspired Swift. She engaged musicians Gary Lightbody and Jacknife Lee of the Irish-Scottish band Snow Patrol, saying, "they can just hit you when they are singing about loss or longing". Lee produced "The Last Time", on which Lightbody sings. Swift wrote more than 30 songs for the album, 16 of which made the final cut of the standard edition. Of those 16 tracks, Swift was the sole writer of 10 and co-wrote the other six.

Composition

Music 

Red spans genres and departs from Swift's previous country-pop sound; it incorporates eclectic elements of styles such as dance-pop, dubstep, Britrock, arena rock, and hip hop. Swift called its diverse musical styles a "metaphor for how messy a real breakup is" and described it as her "only true breakup album". The album's first half consists of country and pop songs intertwined with each other; three tracks—"22", "I Knew You Were Trouble", and "We Are Never Ever Getting Back Together"—embrace a pure pop production, electronic vocal processing, and hip-hop-influenced bass drums. The rock stylings of Speak Now expand on tracks "State of Grace" and "Holy Ground", which musicologist James E. Perone found reminiscent of 1980s arena rock. Other tracks including "I Almost Do", "Stay Stay Stay", "Sad Beautiful Tragic", and "Begin Again", embrace the country sound of Swift's earlier music.

Critics were divided on the album's genre classification. Jon Dolan's review for Rolling Stone appeared in their column for country music, but he described Swift's musical foundation as "post-country rock". Some reviewers commented that Red blurred the divide between country and pop, but others called it a straightforward pop album with little trace of country. Journalists, including the Los Angeles Times' Randall Roberts and The New York Times' Jon Caramanica, wrote that Red signifies Swift's inevitable move in mainstream pop to broaden her audience. The former said much of the album could perform well on commercial country radio but at its core, it is "perfectly rendered American popular music" with influences from modern trends; the latter remarked Swift as "a pop star in a country context". For American Songwriter's Jewly Hight, debating Swift's genre was pointless because her work is meant for a young audience who thinks of music "iPod shuffle-fluidly".

Lyrics and themes 

Although Red transcends Swift's country roots, her storytelling ability, nurtured by this country background, remains intact in her songwriting. The album's title refers to what Swift termed the tumultuous, extreme, "red" emotions that were evoked by unhealthy romantic relationships she was experiencing during the album's conception phase; such emotions ranged "from intense love, intense frustration, jealousy, confusion" and shaped the lyrics. Pitchforks Brad Nelson summed up the album's theme as disappearances, from lost romance and relationships to Swift's old country sound. For Nelson, this serves as the influence for the album cover, on which Swift is looking downward with her face partially shadowed from her brimmed hat. Reviewers observed the similarities between the cover of Red and that of Canadian singer-songwriter Joni Mitchell's 1971 album Blue, which inspired Swift's songwriting on Red.

Whereas Swift's previous songs contain fantasy-driven narratives with happy endings, Red realizes the uneasy reality of how a seemingly enduring relationship can painfully end. In the album's liner notes, Swift quotes a line from Pablo Neruda's poetry collection Tonight I Can Write (The Saddest Lines), "Love is so short, forgetting is so long", which she deems simultaneously relatable and simple, appropriate for the album's overarching theme. Critics observed a sign of maturity in Swift's perspectives and recognized additional themes—wide-eyed optimism, insecurity about one's perceived image, and the pressure of stardom. Hints of sex, absent from Swift's earlier music, are apparent on Red, which coincided with her outgrowing of her public image as an innocent sweetheart.

The A.V. Club's Michael Gallucci acknowledged the deeper observations of Red's songs but did not appreciate their criticism of Swift's ex-lovers. NPR's J. English, meanwhile, noted the album portrays Swift at her most vulnerable and maturity for recognizing her coming of age in "plaintive, reflective tones". Billboard similarly noted the album's portrayal of maturity through vulnerability, saying "she most effectively lays bare her emotional life in all its messy complexity". Most of the songs on Red were inspired by one ex-boyfriend who, according to Swift, contacted her after listening to the album and described the experience as "bittersweet".

 Songs 
 

Red opens with "State of Grace", an arena-rock song featuring chiming guitars, dynamic drums, and lyrics about the tumultuous feelings that are evoked by the first sights of love. The title track, "Red", incorporates acoustic banjo, guitars, and electronic voice manipulation. It combines soft rock, country, and mainstream pop. Its refrain relates the stages of love to colors; "losing him" is blue, "missing him" is dark gray, and "loving him" is red. The third track, "Treacherous", begins with slow guitar strumming and percussion and gradually builds up, with lyrics about fighting to protect a dangerous relationship. "I Knew You Were Trouble", which Swift said was a completely new style for her, begins with a pop-rock production before building into a dubstep-tinged refrain with aggressive synthesizer backing. Its narrator blames herself for a toxic relationship that has ended. Critics considered the track Swift's most radical sonic change on Red, with Perone viewing the syncopated bass drums as exemplary of her experimenting with hip hop, and Caramanica saying the dubstep drop was "a wrecking ball, changing the course not just of the song but also of Ms. Swift's career".

Critics regarded "All Too Well" as the album's emotional centerpiece. It features a slow-burning production blending country, folk, and arena rock, with overdubs of acoustic guitar, electric guitar, bass, drums, and background vocals. The lyrics chronicle a lost relationship from the peak of romance to the lingering memories after it has ended. The imagery of a scarf left in a drawer became a symbol associated with the song; according to critic Rob Sheffield of Rolling Stone, "no other song does such a stellar job of showing off her ability to blow up a trivial little detail into a legendary heartache". "All Too Well" is followed by "22", a pop song featuring pulsing synthesizers that recall 1980s pop. The lyrics of "22" celebrate the joys of being young and confident while acknowledging the uncertainty of adulthood, and the heartache the narrator and her friends endured in the past. "I Almost Do" is a country-pop and soft-rock ballad featuring gentle guitar strums. In the song, a narrator struggles to decide if she should rekindle with a former lover. It is followed by "We Are Never Ever Getting Back Together", in which the narrator promises her ex-lover they will never rekindle their broken relationship. The song is a gleeful dance-pop tune with pulsing synthesizers, processed guitar sounds, and hip-hop-influenced bass drums.

"Stay Stay Stay" is a fast-tempo song combining country with elements of 1980s pop. It is instrumented with a toy piano, ukulele, mandolin, and hand claps, and has lyrics about two lovers trying to reconcile after a fight. "The Last Time", a duet with Gary Lightbody, has a melancholic production backed by string instruments; Perone compared its production with the music of late-1970s and early-1980s rock bands but with a muted texture. Both Swift and Lightbody sing lead vocals; in the first verse, Lightbody sings about his character's perspective on a failing long-term relationship and in the second verse, Swift presents her character's view. The refrain is backed by strings and brass, intensifying the emotional tension between the two. In "Holy Ground", a narrator reminisces about an absent lover and the fleeting moments of their past. It is a country rock and heartland rock track with persistent drums and a recurring guitar riff. The next track, "Sad Beautiful Tragic", is a melancholic, slow, folk-oriented waltz about a doomed love affair.

The soft-rock "The Lucky One" is a cautionary tale about the perils of celebrity. Narrated from a third-person perspective, it references the story of a successful singer who "chose the rose garden over Madison Square". "Everything Has Changed" featuring Ed Sheeran is a stripped-back guitar ballad about a blossoming new romance, and "Starlight" is an uptempo, dance-pop song about Robert F. and Ethel Kennedy's relationship. The standard edition's final track, "Begin Again", is a gentle country song expressing a narrator's vulnerability post-breakup and willingness to start over. Perone noted Red, after exploring other genres, concludes with a country song, confirming the importance of Swift's musical roots.

The deluxe edition of Red includes the extra original songs "The Moment I Knew", "Come Back ... Be Here", and "Girl at Home"; original demo recordings of "Treacherous" and "Red", and an acoustic version of "State of Grace". "The Moment I Knew" is a somber piano ballad and narrates a story of a woman's birthday party from which, despite a Christmas theme and good friends, her boyfriend is absent, signaling a failing relationship. The 2000s-adult-contemporary-oriented "Come Back... Be Here" has lyrics about a long-distance relationship with few chances to endure. "Girl at Home", a song combining country with 1980s music elements, is about a woman's feelings when her boyfriend is out and flirting with other women.

 Release and promotion 
 Marketing 

Swift and Big Machine implemented an extensive marketing plan for Red. On August 13, 2012, Swift announced the album's details through a live webchat via Google Hangouts, and released the lead single, "We Are Never Ever Getting Back Together", which was her first number-one song on the US Billboard Hot 100. An alternative version of "We Are Never Ever Getting Back Together" was released to US country radio; it spent ten weeks atop Hot Country Songs. On September 22, Swift announced on Good Morning America a four-week song release countdown from September 24 until the album's release week. The four songs—"Begin Again", "Red", "I Knew You Were Trouble", and "State of Grace"—were released for digital download onto the iTunes Store. "Begin Again", which peaked at number seven on the US Billboard Hot 100, was later released as a single to US country radio on October 1, 2012.

Both the standard and deluxe versions of Red were released on October 22, 2012. In the US, the standard edition was available in digital and physical formats, and the deluxe edition containing six extra tracks was available exclusively for physical purchase at Target. Swift had tie-ins with corporations including Keds, Walmart, and Papa John's. A day after the release, she began a cycle of television appearances, starting with a live performance on Good Morning America, which was followed by pre-recorded television appearances on such talk shows as The Ellen DeGeneres Show and 20/20. She gave interviews to as many as 72 radio stations, mostly in the US and some international outlets from South Africa, New Zealand, Spain, Germany, and Mexico. Her live performances at awards shows included the MTV Video Music Awards, the Country Music Association Awards, and the American Music Awards.

Red was further promoted with a string of singles. "I Knew You Were Trouble" was released as an official single to pop radio on November 27, 2012; it was a big hit on pop radio, peaking for seven weeks atop Mainstream Top 40. The single peaked at number two on the Billboard Hot 100, and was a top-ten hit in Oceania and Europe. "22" was released to pop radio in March 2013 and "Red" was released to country radio in June 2013. The singles peaked at number 20 and number six on the Billboard Hot 100, respectively. Tracks "Everything Has Changed" and "The Last Time" were also released as singles, with the latter having a UK-exclusive release. Despite Red's promotion as a country album, its diverse musical styles sparked a media debate over Swift's status as a country artist. Spin argued Red is difficult to categorize because country music is "the most dynamically vibrant pop genre of the last decade or so". Other critics commented Swift had always been more pop-oriented than country and described Red as her inevitable move to mainstream pop. In an interview with the Wall Street Journal, Swift responded country music "feels like home" and dismissed the debate, saying "I leave the genre labeling to other people".

 Touring 

Swift announced the album's accompanying world tour, the Red Tour, shortly after the album's release. On October 26, 2012, she announced the first 58 dates for the North American leg, beginning in Omaha, Nebraska, visiting Canada and the US throughout the spring and summer of 2013, and concluding in Nashville, Tennessee, in September. To support a high demand, Swift held the concerts mostly in sports arenas and stadiums. After the North American leg, the Red Tour visited Australasia, the UK, and Asia.

The Red Tour was a box office success. The four shows at Staples Center in Los Angeles extended Swift's total of sold-out shows to 11, making her the solo artist with the most sold-out shows at Staples Center. She was the first female artist to sell out the Sydney Football Stadium since its opening in 1988. Tickets for the Shanghai show sold out within 60 seconds, setting the Chinese record for the fastest sellout. When it ended in June 2014, the tour had grossed $150.2 million and became the highest-grossing tour by a country artist of all time.

 Commercial performance 
In the US, Red debuted at number one on the Billboard 200 with first-week sales of 1,208,000 copies, surpassing Garth Brooks's Double Live  (1998) as the fastest-selling country album. With Speak Now and Red, Swift was recognized in the Guinness World Records as the "First Solo Female with Two Million-Selling Weeks on the U.S. Albums Chart". Red spent seven non-consecutive weeks at number one on the Billboard 200, and made Swift the first female artist, and the second after the Beatles, to have three consecutive studio albums each spend six or more weeks atop the chart. It was the third consecutive time—after Fearless (2008) and Speak Now (2010)—that Swift had a number-one album during the last week before Christmas, traditionally the most competitive week of the year. On Billboard Top Country Albums chart, it spent 16 weeks at number one, and was the year-end number-one album of both 2012 and 2013. Surpassing 3.11 million copies after two months of sales, Red was the second-highest-selling album of 2012. As of October 2020, its US sales stood at 4.49 million copies. The Recording Industry Association of America (RIAA) certified the album seven-times Platinum for surpassing seven million album-equivalent units.

The album reached number one on the record charts of European and Oceanic countries, including Australia, Canada, New Zealand, Ireland, and Scotland. It received multi-platinum certifications in Australia (4× Platinum), Canada (4× Platinum), and New Zealand (2× Platinum). In the UK, Red was Swift's first number one on the Albums Chart and had four number-one songs on the Singles Chart, the most of Swift's albums; it was certified 2× Platinum by the British Phonographic Industry (BPI) and sold 772,000 copies . Less than a month after its release, Red sold 2.8 million copies worldwide. By the end of 2012, Red finished as the global second-best-selling album with 5.2 million copies. By August 2014, it had sold over eight million copies.

 Critical reception 

Red generally received positive reviews from contemporary critics, most of whom commended Swift's songwriting. Jon Dolan from Rolling Stone called the album "a 16-song geyser of willful eclecticism", said Swift "often succeeds in joining the Joni [Mitchell]/Carole King tradition of stark-relief emotional mapping", and that "When she's really on, her songs are like tattoos". Pitchforks Brad Nelson lauded the "newfound patience to Swift's observations" and deeper exploration of emotion in Reds songwriting.

The album's production polarized critics. Billboard praised Red radio-friendly tunes that catapulted Swift to even greater fame. Stephen Thomas Erlewine from AllMusic asserted that although Swift's lyrics about romantic relationships and social anxiety sound somewhat clumsy, they add substance to "the pristine pop confections", which makes Red a compelling album. The Guardian Kate Mossman described the album as "one of the finest fantasies pop music has ever constructed". Roberts was impressed by the different musical styles as Swift "strives for something much more grand and accomplished". Caramanica agreed, commenting that the production is a striking feature of Red that proves Swift is more of a pop star than a country singer.

Critics often considered Red to be a sign of Swift growing up. Billboard considered Red to be her first adult pop album, describing her previous works as that of "an accomplished teenager". Caramanica stated that her growth was "largely musical, not experiential." He noted that she was beginning to show more maturity as a strategist and adult. Caramanica asserted that there are indications that Red shows her "body is as alive as her mind," which was "territory she’s generally skipped before now." Dolan considered the album part "Joni Mitchell-influenced maturity binge" and part pop, describing the combination as "not just inevitable but natural." Spin Michael Robbins characterized the album as a record "full of adult pleasures".

Some reviewers were more reserved in their praise. Jonathan Keefe from Slant Magazine considered Red not consistent enough to be "truly great" but asserted that some of the songs were "career-best work for Swift, who now sounds like the pop star she was destined to be all along". Michael Gallucci from The A.V. Club argued the music was more ambitious than Swift's previous records but considered the album as a whole "complicated and sometimes unfocused". He considered the duets boring and the occasional use of Auto-Tune to "sound like any number of indistinguishable female pop singers". Writing for MSN Music, Robert Christgau viewed Red as an inferior version of the Magnetic Fields' 1999 album 69 Love Songs but appreciated "Begin Again" and "Stay Stay Stay", considering them to "stay happy and hit just as hard" as songs on 69 Love Songs. The Daily Telegraph James Lachno found the production bloated and commented the album would be better had Swift fully embraced mainstream pop and abandoned her old country sound. Mesfin Fekadu of the Associated Press asserted that the album "sounded empty" compared to Fearless (2008) and Speak Now (2010), but praised "I Almost Do" and the duets.

 Accolades 

Red received accolades in terms of both critical and popular recognition. Mainstream publications featuring Red on their lists of the best albums of 2012 included Billboard, The Daily Beast, The Guardian, Idolator, MTV News, Newsday, PopMatters, Rolling Stone, Spin, and Stereogum. Critic Jon Caramanica ranked the album second on his list of 2012's best albums for The New York Times. Red was placed at number 17 on the 2012 Pazz & Jop, an annual mass critics' poll conducted by The Village Voice. Spin proclaimed Red one of 2012's best country albums.

At the 56th Grammy Awards in 2014, Red was nominated for Album of the Year and Best Country Album. The album received nominations at US country music awards, including two nominations for Album of the Year at the 2013 Country Music Association Awards and the 2013 Academy of Country Music Awards. It won Favorite Country Album at the 2013 American Music Awards, Top Album and Top Country Album at the 2013 Billboard Music Awards, Top Selling Album at the 2013 Canadian Country Music Association Awards, and Top Selling International Album of the Year at the 2014 Country Music Awards of Australia.

 Impact and legacy 

Red appeared on many publications' lists of the best albums of the 2010s. According to Metacritic, it was the fifteenth-most-acclaimed album of the decade. It featured on Atwood Magazine unranked list, and was included on lists of The Independent and Pitchfork. It was ranked within the top 10 by  Insider (first), Uproxx (third), Billboard (fourth), Rolling Stone (fourth), the Tampa Bay Times (ninth), and Stereogum (tenth). Taste of Country ranked Red as one of the best country albums of the decade. In 2020, Rolling Stone ranked Red at number 99 on its revised list of the 500 Greatest Albums of All Time.

The album's production straddling country and pop inspired Swift to venture into genres she had not tried before. The successful pop radio singles, specifically the dubstep-infused "I Knew You Were Trouble", served as a "signal flare" for Swift to collaborate with pop producers Max Martin and Shellback, who are known for radio-friendly pop, again. Upon reading reviews calling Red an inconsistent album, Swift fully embraced the electropop sound, transcending her earlier country image. Its upbeat pop production laid the groundwork for the electropop and synth-pop sound of her next album, 1989 (2014). Swift continued to explore pop with its successors Reputation (2017) and Lover (2019).

Many critics claim Red as Swift's best body of work. According to Pitchfork, Red progressed Swift's sound "to meet the highest aspirations of her songwriting", watching her push herself outside of traditional boundaries "to stray into the interzone between pop and country". Clash demarcated Red as the turning point of Swift's career—it "was the first time Taylor actively stepped away from the pretty dresses and southern girl chic" to the outrage of "old fashioned listeners". According to the magazine, Red proved an album can be "both ground-breaking and wildly commercial", because avant-garde is not the only way to experiment with music, as Swift "opened a door for every other musician" in 2012 to coalesce multiple genres. Jordan Sargent of Spin named Red "one of the best pop albums of our time".

Various media outlets have credited Red with inspiring a generation of artists; The New York Times critic Steven Hyden said Red encouraged new indie artists to put out music that is "aesthetically much closer to Swift's pop than anything in the rock underground". MTV said Red normalized intimacy in pop music and popularized Swift's vulnerable songwriting style with future artists such as Halsey, Kacey Musgraves, Troye Sivan, Billie Eilish, Olivia Rodrigo, and Conan Gray. Fans and critics have also dubbed Red an "autumnal album" due to its aesthetic and lyrical imagery. In 2019, an indie rock album titled ReRed, featuring Wild Pink, Adult Mom, Chris Farren, and other artists, was released as a tribute to Red. All of its proceeds go to Equal Justice Initiative.

 2021 re-recording 

In November 2020, following a dispute over the ownership of the masters to her back catalog, Swift began re-recording her first six studio albums. Fearless (Taylor's Version), the first of her re-recorded albums, was released on April 9, 2021. On June 18, 2021, Swift announced Red (Taylor's Version) would be released on November 12, 2021, seven days earlier than originally planned. The new album contains all 30 songs Swift recorded for the 2012 release of Red; these include the charity single "Ronan", her recordings of the 2016 Little Big Town single "Better Man" and 2018 Sugarland single "Babe", the ten-minute version of "All Too Well", and six other new tracks.

 Track listing 
All songs written by Taylor Swift, except for where noted.

 Notes 
 "I Knew You Were Trouble" is stylized as "I Knew You Were Trouble.".

 Personnel 
Credits are adapted from AllMusic.Musicians Taylor Swift – lead vocals, background vocals, acoustic guitar
 Nathan Chapman – bass guitar, drums, acoustic guitar, electric guitar, keyboards, mandolin, percussion, piano, soloist, synthesizer, background vocals
 Peggy Baldwin – cello
 Brett Banducci – viola
 Jeff Bhasker – bass guitar, keyboards, piano, background vocals
 J. Bonilla – drums, percussion
 Nick Buda – drums
 Tom Bukovac – electric guitar
 David Campbell – string arrangements, conducting
 Daphne Chen – violin
 Lauren Chipman – viola
 Eric Darken – percussion
 Marcia Dickstein – harp
 Richard Dodd – cello
 Paul Franklin – steel guitar
 Eric Gorfain – violin
 Dann Huff – bouzouki, electric guitar, high strung guitar, mandolin
 Charlie Judge – accordion, Hammond B3, piano, upright piano, strings, synthaxe, synthesizer
 Gina Kronstadt – violin
 John Krovoza – cello
 Marisa Kuney – violin
 Jacknife Lee – bass guitar, guitar, keyboards
 Max Martin – keyboards
 Grant Mickelson – guitar
 Anders Mouridsen – guitar
 Jamie Muhoberac – cello
 Neli Nikolaeva – violin
 Owen Pallett – conductor, orchestration
 Radu Pieptea – violin
 Simeon Pillich – contrabass
 Wes Precourt – violin
 Bill Rieflin – drums
 Shellback – bass guitar, guitar, acoustic guitar, electric guitar, keyboards
 Jake Sinclair – bass guitar, background vocals
 Jimmie Lee Sloas – bass guitar
 Aaron Sterling – drums
 Jeff Takiguchi – contrabass
 Andy Thompson – guitar, electric piano
 Ilya Toshinsky – mandolin
 Butch Walker – drums, guitar, keyboards, percussion, background vocals
 Patrick Warren – string arrangements
 Amy Wickman – violin
 Dan Wilson – bass guitar, electric guitar, piano, background vocals
 Rodney Wirtz – violin
 Jonathan Yudkin – fiddle, violin
 Caitlin Evanson – background vocals
 Elizabeth Huett – background vocals ("The Moment I Knew")
 Tyler Sam Johnson – background vocals
 Gary Lightbody – featured artist, background vocals
 Ciara O'Leary – background vocals
 Ed Sheeran – featured artistProduction Taylor Swift – songwriting, production
 Nathan Chapman – production, engineering
 Joe Baldridge – engineering
 Sam Bell – engineering
 Matt Bishop – engineering
 Delbert Bowers – assistant
 Chad Carlson – engineering
 Tom Coyne – mastering
 Leland Elliott – assistant
 Jeff Bhasker – production
 Eric Eylands – assistant
 Greg Fuess – assistant
 Chris Galland – assistant
 Şerban Ghenea – mixing
 Matty Green – assistant
 John Hanes – mixing engineering
 Sam Holland – engineering
 Dann Huff – production
 David Huff – digital editing
 Michael Ilbert – engineer
 Tyler Sam Johnson – guitar engineer
 Jacknife Lee – engineering, production, songwriting, programming
 Gary Lightbody – songwriting
 Steve Marcantonio – engineer
 Manny Marroquin – mixing
 Max Martin – production, songwriting
 Seth Morton – assistant
 Justin Niebank – mixing
 Chris Owens – assistant
 John Rausch – engineering
 Matt Rausch – engineering
 Tim Roberts – assistant
 Eric Robinson – engineeringg
 Liz Rose – songwriting
 Pawel Sek – engineering
 Shellback – production, songwriting, programming
 Ed Sheeran – songwriting
 Jake Sinclair – engineering
 Mark "Spike" Stent – mixing
 Andy Thompson – engineering
 Butch Walker – production
 Hank Williams – mastering
 Brian David Willis – engineer
 Dan Wilson – production, songwritingVisuals and design Taylor Swift – creative director
 Sarah Barlow – photography
 Austin Hale – designing
 Jemma Muradian – hair stylist
 Bethany Newman – art direction
 Josh Newman – art direction
 Lorrie Turk – make-up artistManagerial'
 Scott Borchetta – executive producer
 Leann Bennett – production coordination
 Jason Campbell – production coordination
 Mike "Frog" Griffith – production coordination
 JoAnn Tominaga – production coordination

Charts

Weekly charts

Year-end charts

Decade-end charts

All-time charts

Certifications and sales

Release history

See also 
 List of Billboard 200 number-one albums of 2012
 List of Billboard 200 number-one albums of 2013
 List of Billboard Top Country Albums number ones of 2012
 List of Billboard Top Country Albums number ones of 2013
 List of number-one albums of 2012 (Australia)
 List of number-one albums of 2012 (Canada)
 List of number-one albums from the 2010s (New Zealand)
 List of UK Albums Chart number ones of the 2010s

Footnotes

References

Citations

Cited literature

External links 

2012 albums
Taylor Swift albums
Albums produced by Taylor Swift
Albums produced by Nathan Chapman (record producer)
Albums produced by Max Martin
Albums produced by Shellback (record producer)
Albums produced by Dan Wilson (musician)
Albums produced by Dann Huff
Albums produced by Jeff Bhasker
Albums produced by Jacknife Lee
Albums produced by Butch Walker
Big Machine Records albums
Canadian Country Music Association Top Selling Album albums
Country albums by American artists
Pop albums by American artists
Rock albums by American artists